The Battle of Peonnum was fought about AD 660 between the West Saxons under Cenwalh and the Britons of what is now Somerset in England. It was a decisive victory for the Saxons, who gained control of Somerset as far west as the River Parrett. The location of the battle is uncertain.

Saxon conquest
The border between the West Saxons and the Britons of Somerset had been set at the Wansdyke along the ridge of the Mendip Hills following the Battle of Deorham and the Saxon occupation of Bath in 577. Then, in 652, Cenwalh broke through at the Battle of Bradford on Avon.

Relief for the Britons came when Cenwalh was exiled to East Anglia after a squabble with Penda of Mercia. Some time after his return he renewed the attack on the British tribes and in 658 his army met the Britons for a climactic battle at Peonnum. The Saxons were victorious, and Cenwalh advanced west through the Polden Hills to the River Parrett, annexing eastern and central Somerset. The territory gained was modest in size; Geoffrey Ashe suggests that Cenwalh's ultimate goal may have been gaining control over the valuable Glastonbury Abbey within it.

The border remained at the Parrett until 681–685, when Centwine of Wessex defeated King Cadwaladr of Gwynedd and his local allies, allowing them to occupy the rest of Somerset west and north to the Bristol Channel. West Saxon rule was consolidated and extended into Devon by King Ina.

Location
The battle is said to have happened æt peonnum, which means "at the penns". Penn is the Brittonic Celtic word for "head" or "top", which here is likely used for "hill" or "peak". Suggested locations include Penselwood (Pen Selwood), near Wincanton which is called Penna in the Domesday Book, Pinhoe or Pen Beacon in Devon, and Penn (near Yeovil).
Note that one of the highest points of the Mendip Hills is named Pen Hill. Cenwalh of Wessex waged a successful campaign against the British in North Somerset, albeit a short-lived one that ended when he was defeated by Wulfhere of Mercia. Cenwalh's battle at Peonnum in 658 was most probably fought at this Pen Hill, north of Wells, as he displaced the Britons from their kingdom called Glastenning. Glastonbury became the seat of Cenwalh’s kingdom, the Britons having yielded the Tor there and the adjacent Polden Hills by withdrawing to the River Parrett.

See also 
 History of Somerset
 Timeline of the Anglo-Saxon invasion and takeover of Britain

Notes

References
Ashe, Geoffrey, From Caesar to Arthur, University of Michigan, 1960.
Major, Albany F., Early Wars of Wessex, Cassell Press, 1978
Yorke, Barbara Wessex in the Early Middle Ages Leicester University Press (31 Aug 1995) 

660s
7th-century conflicts
7th century in England
Peonnum
Peonnum
Military history of Somerset